Adel Bettaieb (born 28 January 1997) is a professional footballer who plays as a forward for Ümraniyespor. Born in France, he has been called up to the Tunisia national team.

Professional career
A youth product of a local club in Villiers-le-Bel for 4 years, Bettaieb moved to the famed French academy INF Clairefontaine at the age of 13, and followed that up with stints at the youth sides of Red Star and Angers. He began his senior career with their reserves in 2014. He transferred to the Belgian National Division 1 club La Louviere on 2 July 2018. He moved to the Luxembourgian club Dudelange in the summer of 2019. He helped Dudelange win the 2021–22 Luxembourg National Division. On 30 June 2022, he signed a professional 1+1 year contract with the newly promoted side Ümraniyespor in the Turkish Süper Lig. He made his professional debut with Ümraniyespor in a 3–3 Süper Lig tie with Fenerbahçe on 8 August 2022.

International career
Born in France, Bettaieb is of Tunisian descent through his father. He was called up to the senior Tunisia national teams in September 2019 without featuring.

Honours
Dudelange
 Luxembourg National Division: 2021–22

References

External links
 
 FDB Profile

1997 births
Living people
People from Villiers-le-Bel
Tunisian footballers
French footballers
French sportspeople of Tunisian descent
Angers SCO players
UR La Louvière Centre players
F91 Dudelange players
Ümraniyespor footballers
Championnat National 3 players
Belgian National Division 1 players
Luxembourg National Division players
Süper Lig players
Association football forwards
Tunisian expatriate footballers
French expatriate footballers
Tunisian expatriates in Belgium
French expatriates in Belgium
French expatriates in Luxembourg
Expatriate footballers in Belgium
Expatriate footballers in Turkey